2002 Kyoto Purple Sanga season

Competitions

Domestic results

J. League 1

Emperor's Cup

J. League Cup

International results

Player statistics

Other pages
 J. League official site

Kyoto Purple Sanga
Kyoto Sanga FC seasons